Pytheas is a small lunar impact crater located on the southern part of the Mare Imbrium, to the south of the crater Lambert. It was named after ancient Greek navigator and geographer Pytheas of Massalia.

It has a sharply defined rim, a hummocky outer rampart, and an irregular interior due to slumping or fall-back. There is a small crater along the northern outer rampart, and a similar crater about 20 km to the west. The crater possesses a small ray system that extends for a radius of about 50 kilometers. It is surrounded by lunar mare that is dusted with ray material from Copernicus to the south.

Satellite craters
By convention these features are identified on lunar maps by placing the letter on the side of the crater midpoint that is closest to Pytheas.

References

External links
Pytheas at The Moon Wiki
 Oblique Apollo 15 image of Pytheas: AS15-92-12576

LROC page: Pytheas

 
 

Impact craters on the Moon
Mare Imbrium